Victoria-Ștefania Petreanu (born 21 January 2003) is a Romanian rowing coxswain. She won a gold medal in the eight at the 2022 World Championships.

References

External links

2003 births
Living people
Romanian female rowers
Coxswains (rowing)
World Rowing Championships medalists for Romania
21st-century Romanian women